St. Patrick School, or SPS, is a private, Roman Catholic school in Maysville, Kentucky, United States. It is located in the Roman Catholic Diocese of Covington. It houses grades K-12, with an average annual enrollment of approximately 140 students in elementary school and 60 in high school.

Background
St. Patrick School was established in 1864. It is the only Catholic high school within a 45-mile radius.

Notable alumni
 Nick Clooney - television/radio personality
 Rosemary Clooney (8th grade graduate) - movies, television, radio personality

References

External links
 School website

Catholic secondary schools in Kentucky
Educational institutions established in 1930
Schools in Mason County, Kentucky
Buildings and structures in Maysville, Kentucky
1930 establishments in Kentucky